The Renault Vivastella was an executive car introduced by Renault in October 1928 and produced for the model years 1929 - 1939.

The car was modified and changed with unusual frequency even by the standards of Renault in the 1930s, and following its evolution in retrospect is rendered more complicated by the way that the Renault catalogue frequently listed two succeeding generations of the model simultaneously, but the Vivastella always occupied a place in the manufacturer's line-up a little below the slightly longer Renault Reinastella. In Latin, "stella" means "star", and viva means "live long".

Evolution
The Vivastella was introduced at the 22nd Paris Motor Show in October 1928 as a more luxurious version of the Renault Vivasix.

First generation
1929 The "Renault Vivastella Type PG2" had an engine of 3180cc (16CV) with claimed output of 52 HP
1930 The "Renault Vivastella Type PG4 was 15 cm larger than the previous model.
1932, a 65 horsepower engine was introduced.
1933, the new series Type PG5 (5 seater) and PG7 (7 seater) were introduced
1934 The "Renault Vivastella Type ZA2" was introduced; it had a radiator behind the engine, which was enlarged in Spring 1934 to 3620cc, now giving a maximum output of 80HP.  The 6-cylinder units shared the same 120mm cylinder stroke length, but the bore (cylinder diameter) on the larger engine was increased by 5mm to 80mm.   Although a new more modern Vivastella was introduced for 1934, the earlier model continued to be listed, at an attractively lower price, in the catalogue.  It incorporated most of the new mechanical elements of the new car, but used the older much more vertical looking bodywork.   Derivative models, the Renault Vivasport and the sporting Renault Viva Grand Sport were also introduced.

Second generation
In 1935, the new Vivastella (Type ACR1) was introduced with a new aerodynamic body.
From 1936, several new Vivastella versions were introduced at approximately six monthly intervals, one after another, Types ADB1, ADB2 (October 1936-March 1937), ADB3 (March 1937-October 1936), ADB4 (October 1937-April 1938), ADB5 (April 1938-) and BDZ1 with a new engine of 4085cc and 100HP, and an (even) more aerodynamic body.

Types

Notes and sources

Vivastella
Cars introduced in 1929
Executive cars
Sedans